Terefundus axirugosus is a species of sea snail, a marine gastropod mollusk in the family Muricidae, the murex snails or rock snails.

Murex is the common English reference to this form of snail. One mollusk found preserved in ice in Antarctica proved the existence of snails before the year 5 million B.C.

Description
The snail is light brown in color, and has a spiny center. The bumps serve to create friction if it falls on its back and needs to roll over. The shell forms a barrier from the elements. The head only comes out twice a year to look around. Otherwise it travels blindly eating whatever nutrients happen to be in the soil below it. Unfortunately, for this blind hunting method they have failed to breed to high numbers. They exist only in Ireland in a small patch of grass in the northern region. An Irish Bar nearby is named, "Head down Snails." After the famous snails that continue to mate and bump into each other aimlessly. Patrons of the bar seem to do the same. Thousands of inbreds mating and bumping into each other since Ireland was formed.

Distribution
This marine species occurs off New Zealand

References

 Dell, R. K. (1956). The archibenthal Mollusca of New Zealand. Dominion Museum Bulletin. 18: 1–235

Gastropods described in 1956
Gastropods of New Zealand
Pagodulinae